The 2016 Gemdale ATP Challenger was a professional tennis tournament played on hard courts. It was the third edition of the tournament which was part of the 2016 ATP Challenger Tour. It took place in Shenzhen, China between 21 and 27 March 2016.

Singles main-draw entrants

Seeds

 1 Rankings are as of March 14, 2016.

Other entrants
The following players received wildcards into the singles main draw:
  Chen Long
  Sun Fajing
  Wang Chuhan
  Qi Xi

The following players received entry courtesy of a special exemption:
  Li Zhe

The following players received entry from the qualifying draw:
  Niels Desein
  Viktor Galović
  Enrique López Pérez
  Jan Šátral

Champions

Singles

 Dudi Sela def.  Wu Di, 6–4, 6–3

Doubles

  Luke Saville /  Jordan Thompson def.  Saketh Myneni/  Jeevan Nedunchezhiyan, 3–6, 6–4, [12–10]

References
 Combined Main Draw

External links

Pingshan Open
Gemdale ATP Challenger
2016 in Chinese tennis